Alexander Lind may refer to:
 Alexander Lind (footballer, born 1989)
 Alexander Lind (footballer, born 2002)